Walter Riggs (1 January 1877 – 10 November 1951) was a sailor from Great Britain, who represented his country at the 1924 Summer Olympics in Le Havre, France. Riggs took the silver in the 8 Metre.

References

Sources
 

British male sailors (sport)
Sailors at the 1924 Summer Olympics – 8 Metre
Olympic sailors of Great Britain
1877 births
1951 deaths
Olympic silver medallists for Great Britain
Olympic medalists in sailing
People from Leiston
Medalists at the 1924 Summer Olympics